Mary Redmond (1863 – 16 January 1930) was an Irish sculptor born in Nenagh, County Tipperary in 1863, and then raised in Ardclough, County Kildare, where her father came to work in the limestone quarries.

Early life
At school in Ardclough she modelled the soft clay from a sinkhole near her home into clay figures. At the age of nine she was sent to live in Dublin to attend Primary school. While there she worked in the studio of Thomas Farrell where she created her first work ‘a hand on a cushion’. She was accepted into the Dublin Metropolitan School of Art where she studied drawing and painting, though she was drawn to working with clay.

Career
Her most famous work, a statue of Father Mathew in Dublin's O’Connell Street was inaugurated in 1893 (or 1891 )  (8 February). She won a contest to create the sculpture, an achievement for a woman artist at the time. According to Nora J Murray’s article in Capuchin Annual (1932) the male model for the Father Mathew statue took the concept of getting plastered a little too far, was dismissed for drunkenness and was later convicted for vandalising her work.

Works
Amongst her other works were a bust of Gladstone, modelled at his home; a bust of Edmund Dwyer Gray (of which thirty repeats were made) a presentation shield to Lord Wolseley and a memorial bust of William Martin.

Later life and death
Redmond married Dr W Dunn, from Florence, in London in 1893. They moved to Italy and lived near Galileo’s tower in Florence. She died there on 16 January 1930.

References

1863 births
1930 deaths
People from Nenagh
People from County Kildare
20th-century Irish sculptors
19th-century Irish sculptors
19th-century Irish women artists
20th-century Irish women artists